Wrexham Association Football Club Women is a Welsh women's football club based in Brymbo that competes in the Genero Adran North, the second-tier of women's football in Wales. Since 2018, the club has been affiliated with Wrexham A.F.C., a men's team in the National League. Wrexham Women were a founding member of the North Wales Women's Football League in 2003 and the Welsh Premier Women's League in 2009.

History

Wrexham AFC Women were reformed in 2018. They joined the North Wales Women's Football League to compete against teams across North Wales. The League was split into 'Division One' and 'Division Two' in North Wales and Wrexham entered the bottom tier as a new club of 'Division Two'. During their first season, Wrexham lifted the North Wales Women's Division Two league cup after beating 'Rhyl Development' 3–2 in the cup final hosted at Bala Towns Maes Tegid. Wrexham finished the first league season in 4th place and gained promotion into the North Wales Women's League Division One.

During Wrexham's second season, the COVID-19 pandemic cut the season short with Wrexham in 8th position in the North Wales Women's League Division One. The Football Association on Wales decided to use a points per game (PPG) calculation to work out the finishing positions for the teams in the league which resulted in Wrexham placing 8th.

For the 2020/21 season the North Wales Women's Football League decided to split the leagues in North Wales into a 'Premier' 'East' and 'West', Wrexham were placed into the East league and was given a start date of February 2021. Due to the Christmas 2020 second lockdown, the 2020/21 season was canceled with no games being played.

Before the start of the 2021/22 season the FAW announced a restructure of Women's football in Wales, a new Tier 2 league split into North and South were created with specific criteria needed in order to enter. The FAW opened up both tier 1 and tier 2 to all clubs to apply to join, Wrexham applied for the Tier 2 North. After a successful application process, Wrexham were awarded a place in the newly restructured FAW Tier 2 North for the 2021/22 season. Wrexham completed a successful first campaign in the new Welsh second tier, finishing runners-up to Llandudno - having lost to the champions in a winner takes all game on the final day of the season at Maesdu Park.

On 9 February 2023, Wrexham A.F.C. announced that following the decision to apply for a Tier 1 license, that the Wrexham A.F.C. Women squad will also become semi-professional, if promoted to the Adran Premier for the 2023/24 season.

Players

Current squad

Honours

Domestic

League
NWWFL Division Two
Promoted (1): 2018-19
Genaro Adran North
Winners (1): 2022–23
Runners-up (1): 2021-22

Cups
NWWFL Division Two League Cup
Winners (1): 2019
NWWFL Supplementary Cup
Runners-up (1): 2019

References

External links
Official Twitter account

Women's football clubs in Wales
Association football clubs established in 2003
Sport in Wrexham
Wrexham A.F.C.
2003 establishments in Wales